Otroea semiflava is a species of beetle in the family Cerambycidae. It was described by Pascoe in 1866. It is known from Moluccas.

Subspecies
 Otroea semiflava giloloensis Breuning, 1948
 Otroea semiflava semiflava Pascoe, 1866

References

Desmiphorini
Beetles described in 1866